Deception is a 1946 American film noir drama released by Warner Brothers and directed by Irving Rapper. The film is based on the 1927 play Monsieur Lamberthier by Louis Verneuil. The screenplay was written by John Collier and Joseph Than. It stars Bette Davis, Paul Henreid, and Claude Rains, who had also appeared together in the highly successful Now, Voyager (1942).

Plot
Christine Radcliffe is seen running in the rain up the stairs of a large symphony hall in which a concert is already underway with a performance of the Haydn cello concerto in D. Her eyes fill with tears as she recognizes the cellist on stage: Karel Novak who spent the war trapped in neutral Sweden. After his performance, Novak is mobbed by well-wishers. He then returns to his dressing room and as the concert is heard resuming after intermission with Schubert's Unfinished Symphony Christine enters and their eyes meet in his mirror. The couple embraces while Christine cries, "I thought you were dead. I saw them kill you."

Karel and Christine return to her apartment.  She has told him that she is living a financially precarious life as a pianist but this conflicts with what Karel sees in her apartment, such as a fur coat hanging in the closet and rare art on display. He makes assumptions and confronts her, but frightens himself with his own vehemence and apologizes, though says he is leaving. She stops him with the confession she lowered herself to taking "rich, untalented pupils" who gifted her with the items.

They marry, but the composer Alexander Hollenius makes a dramatic entrance at their wedding reception. It is evident he is jealous, and the stress leads him to squeeze until it shatters a wine glass he is holding. Hollenius soon gives Novak a manuscript score of his new cello concerto, which Novak agrees to perform at its premiere. It becomes apparent to Christine that a cellist in the orchestra, Bertram Gribble, is being tutored in the solo part by Hollenius. Suspecting the sabotage of her husband's career, she unsuccessfully attempts to bribe Gribble into not co-operating.

Friction develops between Novak and Hollenius, and the composer angrily breaks off a dress rehearsal on the grounds of Novak's temperamental behavior. He does, however, make it clear that he intends to have Novak play  the concerto.  On the evening of the premiere, Christine visits Hollenius, who threatens to allow Novak the joy of a successful performance only to destroy him by telling him about their love affair. Distraught, Christine shoots him dead.

Another conductor, Neilsen, takes the place of the absent Hollenius, and the performance is a great success. While well-wishers wait, Christine confesses everything to her husband, and they leave the concert hall together. As they walk out a lady says, "Oh, Christine, you must be the happiest woman in the world," which eventually elicits a wan smile from Christine.

Cast
 Bette Davis as Christine Radcliffe
 Paul Henreid as Karel Novak
 Claude Rains as Alexander Hollenius
 John Abbott as Bertram Gribble
 Benson Fong as Jimmy, Hollenius' manservant
 Richard Erdman as Jerry Spencer, music student (uncredited)
 Einar Neilsen as Neilsen, orchestra conductor (uncredited)

Production
The film was based on a play  Monsieur Lamberthier by Louis Verneuil, which was first performed in Paris in 1927. It opened on Broadway as Jealousy on October 22, 1928 at Maxine Elliott's Theatre, as a two-hander (a play with only two main characters), with Fay Bainter and John Halliday. It was turned into a film, also titled Jealousy (1929), with Jeanne Eagels and Fredric March, and directed by Jean de Limur. The play was presented again on Broadway on October 1, 1946 under the title Obsession at the Plymouth Theatre, with Eugenie Leontovich and Basil Rathbone. Warner Bros. originally purchased the play as a vehicle for Barbara Stanwyck and Paul Henreid.

According to TCM, Davis wanted Deception to be a two-character film, like the play. In the play, the character played by Rains is a voice on the phone. The 1929 film is set in Paris, and the characters are the owner of a dress shop, the young artist she marries, and the elderly boulevardier who bought the dress shop for her. The young man confesses, and the play ends with the expectation that he will get off easily. Glenn Erickson observes: “ In the original play the Karel Novak character is the one moved to violence at the conclusion, so Deception may be a case of a play distorted by the needs of the Hollywood Star Vehicle. Also gumming up the works is the Production Code, which wasn't about to accept a woman finding happiness after admitting to years of unmarried sex.”

The working title of the film was “Her Conscience,”  but Davis objected. The title “Jealousy” was not available.

Paul Henreid says he enjoyed working with Bette Davis again but did not get along with Irving Rapper, the two men barely speaking to each other.

According to Alicia Malone's introduction on Turner Classic Movies, stories persist that pianist Shura Cherkassky’s hands are seen on-screen during Davis's solo piano performance of Beethoven's Piano Sonata No. 23, Opus 57 in F Minor (Appassionata), but the fact is that Davis rehearsed so thoroughly that she was able to synchronize with the recorded playback perfectly on the first take.  Indeed, Malone adds, Davis wanted to become proficient enough to play live for the camera, but director Irving Rapper told her that it was not worth the effort, because no one would believe it.

Henreid's cello playing was dubbed by Eleanor Aller, who was pregnant with her son Frederick Zlotkin, who is now a noted cellist. Her father, Gregory Aller, coached Henreid in plausible bow movements. For some scenes, Henreid’s arms were tied behind him, and two cellists put their arms through the sleeves of a specially designed coat.

Hollenius' Cello Concerto was written by Erich Wolfgang Korngold, who composed the music for this film. Korngold subsequently expanded this material and published it as his own cello concerto. Near the beginning of the film, Jerry Spencer, an eager student reporter (Richard Erdman), asks Karel “Which of the living composers should I admire?” Karel demurs, but when asked who he likes best, he replies: “Stravinsky when I think of the present, Richard Strauss when I think of the past, and of course, Hollenius, who combines the rhythm of today with the melody of yesterday.” The last is an apt description of and probable tribute to Korngold.

Bette Davis found out that she was pregnant during filming.

Reception

Critical response
Despite the earlier success of Davis, Henreid, Rains and director Rapper, and generally positive reviews, Deception proved to be an expensive exercise for its producers. With high production costs and modest cinema patronage, it became the first Bette Davis film to lose money for Warner Bros.

Film critic Dennis Schwartz generally liked the film, writing, "Irving Rapper (Shining Victory/Now, Voyager/Rhapsody in Blue) helms this labored romantic melodrama, a remake of the early talkie 1929 Jealousy that was also based on a Louis Verneuil play. It's written by John Collier and Joseph Than ... With classical music filling the background, cheesy soap opera dialogue in the forefront, histrionics taking over the concert hall, none of the characters being likable and Bette Davis as hammy as ever, this preposterous opera-like tale is amazingly enjoyable as straight theatrical drama that is nevertheless campy and could easily have been treated as comedy."

Glenn Erickson  notes that “The real fun is watching Claude Rains sink his teeth into a worthy role... Rains is always great when playing intense, articulate men imposing their will on others and his Hollenius is quite a creation. The haughty composer pauses more than once to tell Christine outright where she's going wrong, explaining to her how she makes it easy for him to control her. Rains' character is by far the most interesting, so it's no surprise that fans credit him with running away with the picture.”

Box office
According to Warner Bros. records, the film earned $2,132,000 domestically and $1,130,000 in foreign markets.

Accolades
The film is recognized by American Film Institute in these lists:
 2005: AFI's 100 Years of Film Scores – Nominated

Home media
On April 1, 2008, Warner Home Video released the film as part of the box set The Bette Davis Collection, Volume 3 before it was released as an individual DVD on July 12, 2015. The upcoming reissue will be released through Warner Archive Collection.

References

Notes

Additional references
 Martin, Mick and Porter, Marsha DVD & Video Guide 2006

External links
 
 
 
 
 Deception informational site and DVD review at DVD Beaver (includes images)
 

1946 films
1946 drama films
American black-and-white films
Remakes of American films
Film noir
Films scored by Erich Wolfgang Korngold
American films based on plays
Films based on works by Louis Verneuil
Films directed by Irving Rapper
Films set in New York City
Films about classical music and musicians
Warner Bros. films
American drama films
1940s English-language films
1940s American films